The national symbols of Kuwait are official and unofficial flags, icons or cultural expressions that are emblematic, representative or otherwise characteristic of Kuwait and of its culture.

Symbol

References 

 
Kuwait
National symbols